Hawk & Parr was an architectural firm in Oklahoma.  It designed many buildings that are listed on the U.S. National Register of Historic Places.  Its Mission/Spanish Revival style Casa Grande Hotel, for example, was built in 1928 and was listed on the National Register in 1995.

It was a partnership of James Watson Hawk (born 1864), also known as J.W. Hawk, and Josepheus O. Parr (died 1940), also known as J.O. Parr.  Hawk had worked as an architect in Oklahoma City since 1905; Parr arrived in 1911; the partnership ran from 1914 to 1932 when Hawk retired.

Works (with variations of attribution) include:
Besse Hotel, 121 E. 4th St., Pittsburg, KS (Hawk & Parr), NRHP-listed
Biltmore Hotel, Oklahoma City, OK, no longer surviving
Casa Grande Hotel, 103 E. Third St., Elk City, OK (Hawk and Parr), NRHP-listed
Commerce Exchange Building, Oklahoma City, OK, no longer surviving
Cotton-Exchange Building, 218 N. Harvey St., Oklahoma City, OK (Hawk & Parr), NRHP-listed
Farmers National Bank, Oklahoma City, OK, no longer surviving
Garfield County Courthouse, W. Broadway, Enid, OK (Hawk & Parr), NRHP-listed
W. T. Hales House, 1521 N. Hudson Ave., Oklahoma City, OK (Hawk & Parr), NRHP-listed
Harbour-Longmire Building, 420 W. Main St., Oklahoma City, OK (Hawk & Parr), NRHP-listed
Hightower Building, 105 N. Hudson, Oklahoma City, OK (Hawk, J.W. and Parr, J.O.), NRHP-listed
Magnolia Petroleum Building, 722 N. Broadway St., Oklahoma City, OK (Hawk & Parr), NRHP-listed
Noble County Courthouse, 300 Courthouse Drive, Perry, Oklahoma, NRHP-listed
McClain County Courthouse, Courthouse Sq., Purcell, OK (Hawk & Parr), NRHP-listed
Norman Public Library, 329 S. Peters Ave., Norman, OK (Hawk and Parr), NRHP-listed
Oklahoma Club, Oklahoma City, OK, no longer surviving
One or more works in Oklahoma College for Women Historic District, Roughly bounded by Grand Ave., 19th St., Alabama Ave., and alley west of 15th St., Chickasha, OK (Smith & Parr), NRHP-listed
Perrine Building, Oklahoma City, OK, built 1927
Pilgrim Congregational Church, 1433 Classen Dr., Oklahoma City, OK (Hawk & Parr), NRHP-listed
Plaza Court, 1100 Classen Dr., Oklahoma City, OK (Hawk & Parr), NRHP-listed
Will Rogers Hotel, 524 W. Will Rogers Blvd., Claremore, OK (Hawk and Parr), NRHP-listed
Scottish Rite Temple, 900 E. Oklahoma, Guthrie, OK (Parr & Hawk), NRHP-listed
Tonkawa Lodge No. 157 A.F. & A.M., 112 N. 7th St., Tonkawa, OK (Hawk & Parr), NRHP-listed
Tradesman's National Bank, Oklahoma City, OK, built 1921
Winfield Public Carnegie Library, 1001 Millington St., Winfield, KS (Parr,J.D.), NRHP-listed

Notes

References

Architecture firms based in Oklahoma
Architects from Oklahoma City